Mauricio Alonso Toledo Gutiérrez (born 19 June 1980) is a Mexican-Chilean politician from the Party of the Democratic Revolution. From 2009 to 2012 he served as Deputy of the LXI Legislature of the Mexican Congress representing the Federal District, and previously served in the IV Legislature of the Legislative Assembly of the Federal District.

He was born in Mexico City to Chilean parents.

In August 2021, Toledo was accused for fleeing to Chile after being impeached due to malpolitics.

References

1980 births
Living people
Politicians from Mexico City
Members of the Congress of Mexico City
Party of the Democratic Revolution politicians
21st-century Mexican politicians
Mexican people of Chilean descent
Deputies of the LXI Legislature of Mexico
Members of the Chamber of Deputies (Mexico) for Mexico City